11085/11086 & 11099/11100 Lokmanya Tilak Terminus–Madgaon Junction AC Double Decker Express was the Double Decker trains of Indian Railways, which were the first of its type to be introduced. They are accommodated with latest stainless steel LHB coach. They link Mumbai, the capital of Maharashtra and Madgaon, an important town in Goa through Konkan Railway. The Double Decker express was discontinued by railways due to less occupancy and substituted with a regular express equipped with LHB coachin November 2022.

Coaches
The 11085/11086 & 11099/11100 Lokmanya Tilak Terminus–Madgaon Junction AC Double Decker Express  had 6 AC Chair Car & 2 EOG cars. As with most train services in India, coach composition may be amended depending on demand.

Service

11085/11086 Lokmanya Tilak Terminus–Madgaon Junction AC Double Decker Express was first introduced on 7 December 2015.  it runs twice a week. The 11099/11100 Lokmanya Tilak Terminus–Madgaon Junction AC Double Decker Express was first introduced on 15 June 2019. It runs weekly.

They cover the distance of 592 kilometres in 12 hours as 11085/Lokmanya Tilak Terminus–Madgaon Junction AC Double Decker Express (47 km/h) & 12 hours as 11086/Madgaon Junction–Lokmanya Tilak Terminus AC Double Decker Express (47 km/h). With maximum speed of 100 km/h.

Route and Halts

 Lokmanya Tilak Terminus
 Thane
 Panvel
 Khed
 Chiplun
 Ratnagiri
 Kankavali
 Sawantwadi
 Thivim
 Madgaon

Traction
It has been hauled by a WAP 7(HOG Equipped) engine from the Kalyan Electric Loco Shed.

References

Sister trains
 Lokmanya Tilak Terminus–Karmali AC Superfast Express
 Dadar–Madgaon Jan Shatabdi Express
 Konkan Kanya Express
 Mandovi Express
 Mumbai CSMT–Karmali Tejas Express

Transport in Mumbai
Transport in Margao
Double-decker trains of India
Rail transport in Maharashtra
Rail transport in Goa